Black Creek is a  brook tributary of the Lehigh River in Carbon County, Pennsylvania, in the United States,.<ref
 name = "gertler">Gertler, Edward. Keystone Canoeing, Seneca Press, 2004. 
</ref>  Its waters start at the very south edge of Weatherly, Pennsylvania at the confluence of Beaver and Hazle Creeks, then runs nearly due east to its mouth on the Lehigh River in Maple Hollow at the former railroad depot of Penn Haven Junction just east of Hinkles Valley.
 name=GmapMeas>Measured using Google maps ruler tool from source to confluence with Quakake Creek — which merge creates Black Creek and the network of streams combining as Quakake Creek. 
</ref>
The tributary Quakake Creek, is the more dispersed and disorganized source waters, originating in over half-a-dozen small streams; it is also listed by the Geographic Names Information System (GNIS) as a variant name for Black Creek.

Black Creek was named because of the because of the dark background pigment in the water created by anthracite coal, but this was a later development as its confluence origin and main course easterly became far more important hosting Railroad trackage than the Turnpike ever hoped to become. Historically, Black Creek was also known as Hazel Creek, stemming from the hazelnut trees that grew alongside its banks,<ref
 name=mcall-88-04-18>How Weatherly Got Its Name, And Other Historical Facts
</ref> though that name in the present-day is given a tributary of Beaver Creek closer to Beaver Meadows, PA.

Black Creek, Beaver Creek and Weatherly are all historically related to the Beaver Meadow Railroad, an 1830 predecessor railway to (purchased in 1855 by the newly formed) Lehigh Valley Railroad corporation (LV or LVRR), which grew to be a famous Class I railway.  The banks-side footpath from the Lehigh River at the 19th century settlement of Lausanne Landing climbed the steep south slopes of Broad Mountain and followed a chain of watercourses to Nescopeck opposite Shickshinny, PA on the main Susquehanna branch. Initially, in 1830, the Beaver Meadow mining operations sent coal out by pack mules, but then capitalized the railway, when the technology was emergent and untried.  Consequently, the creek hosted the first operating steam locomotives employed as mobile traction engines in the United States.

Black Creek joins the Lehigh River near the community of Rockport, the closest occupied place to Penn Haven Junction in the midst of the rough terrain of the Lehigh River Gorge.

See also
List of rivers of Pennsylvania

Notes

References

Tributaries of the Lehigh River
Rivers of Pennsylvania
Rivers of Carbon County, Pennsylvania